Bashville is a British musical adapted by David William and  Benny Green  from George Bernard Shaw's play The Admirable Bashville, with music by Denis King and lyrics by Benny Green. It was originally produced at the Regent's Park Open Air Theatre.

Bashville was nominated for Best New Musical at the 1983 Olivier Awards.

References 

British musicals
1983 musicals
Musicals based on plays